Thomas "Daddy" White (c. 1740, probably in Surrey – 28 July 1831, Reigate) was a noted English cricketer.

White played in the 1760s and 1770s; details of his early career are largely unknown but he retired in 1779.  He is known to have appeared frequently for Surrey and All-England since recorded scorecards first became commonplace in 1772.  He was a genuine all-rounder who was successful as both a batsman and a change bowler.

While playing he lived at Reigate in Surrey.  There has been some confusion in various accounts between him and the similarly named Shock White of Brentford in Middlesex.  The main cause of this confusion was the wide bat controversy which took place on 23–24 September 1771, when, "...one White of Reigate" tried to use a bat that was fully as wide as the wicket itself.

The incident occurred when White was playing for Chertsey versus Hambledon at Laleham Burway.  The Hambledon players not unreasonably objected and a formal protest was made by Thomas Brett, as Hambledon's opening bowler; this was signed by himself, his captain Richard Nyren and master batsman John Small.  The incident brought about a change in the 1774 version of the Laws of Cricket wherein the maximum width of the bat was set at four and one quarter inches.

White may have done this with the intention of seeking an unfair advantage or merely as a prank, or possibly even to force the issue in order to get the Laws changed.  Straight bats had replaced the old hockey stick shape a few years earlier (in response to bowlers pitching instead of rolling the ball as formerly) and the width issue may have been rankling.  His motive remains a mystery but the Hambledon objection has been preserved by Marylebone Cricket Club (MCC).  The Laws were formally changed in 1774.

References

English cricketers
Surrey cricketers
English cricketers of 1701 to 1786
1740 births
1831 deaths
People from Reigate
Kent cricketers
Non-international England cricketers